Glen Emile Gauthier is a Canadian sound mixer. He is best known for his work on the film The Shape of Water (2017), for which he was nominated for an Academy Award and a British Academy Film Award. He has won two Gemini Awards and five Genie Awards.

Gauthier has his own sound company, called Noise Boys Inc., in Toronto, Ontario.

Education
Gauthier attended Prince of Wales Public School and Kenner Collegiate while growing up in Peterborough, Ontario.

Awards and nominations
Major awards

Academy Awards

British Academy Film Awards

Gemini Awards

Genie Awards

References

External links
 

Living people
Production sound mixers
Best Sound Genie and Canadian Screen Award winners
Best Sound Editing Genie and Canadian Screen Award winners
People from Peterborough, Ontario
Year of birth missing (living people)
Place of birth missing (living people)